Mengbwa Hyacinthe Akamba (born 18 August 1985) is a Cameroonian professional footballer, who plays as a midfielder for NK Šampion.

Career
Nicknamed Papso, he was born in Yaonde and he played as striker in Macedonia with FK Renova, then in Albania with KF Bylis Ballsh, KF Skenderbeu and KF Elbasani, in Slovenia with NK Šmartno 1928 and Austria with Traibach.

References

1985 births
Living people
Footballers from Yaoundé
Cameroonian footballers
Association football midfielders
Cameroonian expatriate footballers
FK Renova players
Expatriate footballers in North Macedonia
Expatriate footballers in Albania
NK Šampion players
Expatriate footballers in Slovenia
Cameroonian expatriate sportspeople in Slovenia
Expatriate footballers in Austria